The Upper Rhine High Command, also incorrectly referred to as Army Group Upper Rhine, was a short-lived headquarters unit of the German Armed Forces (Wehrmacht) created on the Western Front during World War II.  The Upper Rhine High Command was formed on 26 November 1944 and deactivated on 25 January 1945.  The sole commander of this headquarters unit was Heinrich Himmler.

Although English language sources refer to this command as an "army group," the German term Oberkommando actually means "high command".  As such, the Oberrhein command was not an army group subordinated to theater command, but a command of importance equal to that of a theater command and one which reported directly to Oberkommando der Wehrmacht (OKW) and Adolf Hitler.  The German term Oberrhein refers to the upper reaches of the Rhine River, the geographical area for which this command had defense responsibility.

Creation
Following successful Allied offensives in November 1944 that forced the Saverne and Belfort Gaps, reached the Rhine River, and liberated Belfort, Strasbourg, and Mulhouse, Hitler ordered the German troops around Colmar in Alsace to hold fast.  German Army Group G (Heeresgruppe G) was stripped of defense responsibility for the area around Colmar and the defense of the Rhine River south of the Bienwald.

On November 26, 1944, the Germans organized the Upper Rhine High Command to defend the upper Rhine. Hitler placed SS Reichsführer Heinrich Himmler in command on December 10, believing that Himmler's presence would stimulate extraordinary efforts by both German military and Nazi Party officials in the region.

The designation of the command as a "High Command" also meant that the Upper Rhine High Command was an independent theater-level command that answered directly to OKW, rather than to the OB West.  OB West was the German command responsible for the rest of the Western Front.  With Himmler in charge of the Upper Rhine High Command, the practical effect was that this army group answered directly to Hitler.  This introduced a largely disadvantageous schism into the German high command for operations on the Western Front.

Organization
The Upper Rhine High Command controlled the German Nineteenth Army as well as several regiments of the German Replacement Army (Ersatzheer) that were mobilized by Military District V (Wehrkreis V) as an emergency measure in reaction to the successful Allied offensives of November 1944.

The battle for Alsace
On December 16, 1944, the Germans attacked in the Ardennes.  What became known as the "Battle of the Bulge" forced the movement of large numbers of U.S. troops north out of Alsace and Lorraine to counter the German attack. In January, additional U.S. troops were moved north in response to the German counter-offensive into northern Alsace, Operation North Wind (Unternehmen Nordwind).  Taking advantage of the stretched Allied lines, Himmler ordered the recapture of Strasbourg.  German troops assaulted across the Rhine near Gambsheim on January 5, 1945 and soon occupied a bridgehead including the towns of Herrlisheim, Drusenheim, and Offendorf north of Strasbourg.  South of Strasbourg, German troops in the Colmar Pocket attacked north toward Strasbourg on January 7, inflicting painful losses on the French II Corps, but were ultimately unable to break the French defense.

Reinforced by elements of the 10th SS Panzer Division, the German troops in the Gambsheim Bridgehead held their own against U.S. and French counterattacks during January 1945, manhandling the U.S. 12th Armored Division at Herrlisheim. The German successes of January, however, marked the high point for the Upper Rhine High Command. The Gambsheim Bridgehead, and further to the south, the Colmar Pocket, would not be reduced by Allied forces until well into February 1945, but the operations of the Upper Rhine High Command after mid-January were defensive in nature.

Inactivation
With the defeat of Operation North Wind and the impending collapse of the Colmar Pocket, the Upper Rhine High Command was inactivated on January 24, 1945, and the responsibility for the defense of the upper Rhine region was again returned to Army Group G.  The staff of the Upper Rhine High Command was used to staff the newly formed Eleventh SS Panzer Army on the Eastern Front. Heinrich Himmler was sent to command Army Group Vistula (Heeresgruppe Weichsel), also on the Eastern Front.

Commanders

See also
 Colmar Pocket

References

Sources
 Kriegstagebuch des Oberkommandos der Wehrmacht, 1944-1945 Teilband I, Percy E. Schramm, Herrsching: Manfred Pawlak, 1982.
 Riviera to the Rhine, Jeffrey J. Clarke and Robert Ross Smith, Washington: Government Printing Office, 1993.
 Verbände und Truppen der deutschen Wehrmacht und Waffen-SS 1939-1945. Die Waffengattungen - Gesamtübersicht, Georg Tessin, Osnabrück: Biblio Verlag, 1973.

O
Military units and formations established in 1944
Military units and formations disestablished in 1945
Heinrich Himmler